Ansonia glandulosa is a species of toads in the family Bufonidae. It is endemic to Sumatra, Indonesia, where it is only known from its type locality, Napal Licin in the Musi Rawas Regency. The holotype, the only known representative of this species, was found close to a small stream in lowland tropical rainforest; the locality is influenced by regular flooding during the rainy season.

References

glandulosa
Fauna of Sumatra
Endemic fauna of Indonesia
Amphibians of Indonesia
Amphibians described in 2004
Taxonomy articles created by Polbot